Jakob Hlasek and Anders Järryd were the defending champions, but did not participate together this year.  Hlasek partnered Guy Forget, losing in the semifinals.  Järryd partnered John Fitzgerald, losing in the second round.

Rick Leach and Jim Pugh won the title, defeating Boris Becker and Cássio Motta 6–4, 3–6, 6–3 in the final.

Seeds
All sixteen seeded teams received byes into the second round.

Draw

Finals

Top half

Section 1

Section 2

Bottom half

Section 3

Section 4

External links
1990 Lipton International Players Championships Doubles Draw

Men's Doubles